Aileen Shaw or Nash (born 21 May 1945) is an Australian former figure skater. She won five Australian national titles, from 1958–59 to 1961–62 and 1963–64. At the age of 14 years and 9 months, she competed at the 1960 Winter Olympics in Squaw Valley, California.

Competitive highlights

References

External links
 
 
 

1945 births
Living people
Australian female single skaters
Olympic figure skaters of Australia
Figure skaters at the 1960 Winter Olympics